Péter Juhász (born 3 August 1948 in Losonc) was a Hungarian football defender, who played for Újpest FC.

He won a silver medal in football at the 1972 Summer Olympics, and also participated in UEFA Euro 1972 for the Hungary national football team.

References

1948 births
Living people
People from Lučenec
Sportspeople from the Banská Bystrica Region
Hungarians in Slovakia
Association football defenders
Hungarian footballers
Hungary international footballers
Volán FC players
Újpest FC players
UEFA Euro 1972 players
Olympic footballers of Hungary
Footballers at the 1972 Summer Olympics
Olympic silver medalists for Hungary
Olympic medalists in football
Medalists at the 1972 Summer Olympics